Bhola Sadar is an upazila of Bhola District in the Division of Barisal, Bangladesh.

Geography
It is bounded by Mehendiganj and Lakshmipur Sadar upazilas on the north, Bauphal and Burhanuddin upazilas on the south, Daulatkhan upazila on the east, Barisal sadar, Mehendiganj and Bakerganj upazilas on the west.

Demographics

According to the 2011 Bangladesh census, Bhola Sadar Upazila had 88,068 households and a population of 430,520, 20.3% of whom lived in urban areas. 11.8% of the population was under the age of 5. The literacy rate (age 7 and over) was 45.2%, compared to the national average of 51.8%.

Administration
Bhola Thana was formed in 1842 and it was turned into an upazila on 1 February, 1984.

Bhola Sadar Upazila is divided into Bhola Municipality and 13 union parishads: Alinagor, Bapta, Charshamya, Dakshin Digholdi, Dhania, Ilisha, Kachia, Paschim Ilisa, Razapur, Shibpur, Uttar Digholdi, Vheduria, and Vhelumia. The union parishads are subdivided into 92 mauzas and 108 villages.

Bhola Municipality is subdivided into 9 wards and 19 mahallas.

Notable residents
 Tofael Ahmed, the Member of Parliament (MP) for constituency Bakerganj-1 from 1973 to 1975, for Bhola-2 from 1986 to 1988, for Bhola-1 from 1991 to 1996, and for Bhola-2 again from 1996 to 2001 and 2009 until 2014, has been MP for constituency Bhola-1 again since 2014.
 Andaleeve Rahman Partho was Member of Parliament for constituency Bhola-1 from 2009 to 2014.
 Sayed Kamaluddin Zafree, Islamic scholar, was born in Bhola.

See also
Upazilas of Bangladesh
Districts of Bangladesh
Divisions of Bangladesh

References

Upazilas of Bhola District